Virbia elisca is a moth in the family Erebidae. It was described by Harrison Gray Dyar Jr. in 1913. It is found in Peru., French Guiana and Ecuador.

References

Moths described in 1913
elisca